Erik Hammer Sørensen (3 September 1902 – 21 January 1973) was a Danish fencer. He competed in five events at the 1936 Summer Olympics.

References

1902 births
1973 deaths
Sportspeople from Aarhus
Danish male fencers
Olympic fencers of Denmark
Fencers at the 1936 Summer Olympics